Åsljunga is a locality situated in Örkelljunga Municipality, Skåne County, Sweden with 659 inhabitants in 2010.

References 

Populated places in Skåne County
Populated places in Örkelljunga Municipality